Qeshlaq-e Hajj Aman (also Romanized as Qeshlāq-e Ḩājj Aman) is a village in Qeshlaq-e Sharqi Rural District, Qeshlaq Dasht District, Bileh Savar County, Ardabil Province, Iran. At the 2006 census, its population was 111, in 24 families.

References 

Towns and villages in Bileh Savar County